Transmorphers: Fall of Man ( Also Known Stylised On Screen Transmorphers II) is a 2009 American science fiction film Directed By Max Taro and produced By Asylum, It is a Sequel to the 2007 film Transmorphers.

As the title suggests, this film is a mockbuster of Transformers: Revenge of the Fallen. The plot, however, borrows from the 2007 Transformers film, Terminator 3: Rise of the Machines, and Maximum Overdrive. Unlike Transformers, the film was released directly to DVD with an R-rating in the United States and a 15 rating in the United Kingdom.

Plot
Taking place 300 years prior to the events of the first film in the then-present-day 2009, the narrator describes how the government knew what was happening. A woman is seen driving recklessly on a California highway while arguing over her cell phone. Police officer Ryan Hadley pulls her over and gives her a warning. The man calls her back, but she tells him off and throws the phone down; the phone then transmorphs into a robotic spider that attacks and kills her.

At Edwards Air Force Base, an NSA officer informs her superior about intercepting a signal. In Los Angeles, Jo Summers is shocked to read in the newspaper about of the death of the woman from the car. In the Kern County Morgue, the police are baffled by the wound that killed the driver. Madison arrives home to discover her television is out. A repairman is called to fix the television. It ends up being Jake, an old friend of Madison, who hasn't seen her since returning from military deployment. Jake investigates her satellite dish and is shocked when it transmorphs into a robot. He runs inside to warn Madison, but when he goes back outside, the robot is gone. Summers meets up with Hadley to investigate the death of the driver, but the NSA show up and asks her to go with them. She advises Hadley to find the driver's missing phone.

A man is driving an SUV when his GPS gives him a five seconds warning to exit the vehicle, before shooting him in the forehead with a laser. Ryan meets with Madison and Jake and hears their story. He takes them in his car to look for the cell phone, but he is called to the scene of the SUV driver's body. A young boy tells Hadley that the SUV dumped the body and drove away by itself. Hadley picks up the first driver's cellular phone from the coroner's office. He then intercepts the SUV, which tries to ram him. When Ryan pulls the SUV over, they are jumped by the satellite robot. They drive away, but are chased by the SUV, who also transmorphs into a robot.

The machines quickly seize control of the Earth. After surviving an assault which kills Hadley, a small group learn that aliens are changing the water and the atmosphere to fit their physiology. They hear about this from a soldier who claims that this information came from Russia, where they captured and tortured one of the machines. They manage to salvage explosives and destroy one of the terraforming devices. This has a negative effect, though: the release of toxic chemicals into the atmosphere, starting a nuclear holocaust that kills billions, to which the machines have adapted, and what is left of mankind takes refuge underground, reluctantly accepting their fate.

Cast

Production
Transmorphers: Fall of Man was released June 30, 2009 (less than a week after the premiere of Transformers: Revenge of the Fallen).

Scott Wheeler directs the film, replacing Transmorphers director Leigh Scott, and the film was also The Asylum's first film to be released on Blu-ray.

Reception
Transmorphers: Fall of Man was met with a mixed critical reaction, and a considerably favorable one to its predecessor. Felix Vasquez Jr. of Cinema Crazed, who gave the original Transmorphers a positive review, said, "There are moments when Transmorphers 2 rises to the occasion and injects a sense of urgency to the proceedings, but it takes too long for anything to happen. It's one long stretch of boring with a few hits of excitement, but the cons drastically affect the pros."

See also
 Transmorphers - The predecessor, by The Asylum
 The Day the Earth Stopped - Another alien invasion film by The Asylum

References

External links
 Transmorphers: Fall of Man at The Asylum
 

2009 independent films
2009 science fiction films
2009 films
Alien invasions in films
American science fiction films
American robot films
The Asylum films
Direct-to-video prequel films
Mockbuster films
Films set in Los Angeles
Films shot in Los Angeles
Films directed by Scott Wheeler
2000s English-language films
2000s American films
American prequel films